Sun Air may refer to:

 Sun Air (South Africa), a defunct South African airline
 Sun Air (Sudan), an airline based in Khartoum, Sudan
 Sun Air Express, an American commuter airline
 Sun-Air of Scandinavia, a British Airways franchisee
 Sunair, a New Zealand airline
 Sun Air, former name of Pacific Sun (airline), an airline based in Nadi, Fiji